Evgeny Gudkov is a Paralympian athlete from Russia competing mainly in category F44 javelin events.

Evgeny won a silver medal in the 2008 Summer Paralympics in the F42/44 javelin, this was after competing in the 2004 Summer Paralympics in the F44/46 discus and javelin.

External links
 

Paralympic athletes of Russia
Athletes (track and field) at the 2004 Summer Paralympics
Athletes (track and field) at the 2008 Summer Paralympics
Paralympic silver medalists for Russia
Living people
Year of birth missing (living people)
Medalists at the 2008 Summer Paralympics
Paralympic medalists in athletics (track and field)
Russian male javelin throwers
20th-century Russian people
21st-century Russian people